Enterprise High School may refer to:

Enterprise High School (Alabama)
Enterprise High School (Redding, California)
Enterprise High School (Oregon)
Enterprise High School (Utah)
Enterprise High School, in the Enterprise School District (Mississippi)